Myasnikovsky District is an administrative and municipal district (raion), one of the forty-three in Rostov Oblast, Russia. It is located in the west of the oblast. Its administrative center is the rural locality (a selo) of Chaltyr. Population: 39,631 (2010 Census);  The population of Chaltyr accounts for 38.7% of the district's total population. The historical ethnic Armenian community constitutes majority of the population of the district, about 60 percent.

See also
 Armenians in Russia
 List of Armenian ethnic enclaves

References

Notes

Sources

Districts of Rostov Oblast